Callao is a city in Macon County, Missouri, United States. The population was 251 at the 2020 census.

History
Callao was laid out in 1858, a year before the railroad was extended to that point. The town most likely took its name from the port city of Callao, Peru. Townsfolk did not know what to call the new town. They hung a map of the world on the wall, blindfolded a man like Pin the Tail on the Donkey, aimed him at the map and his finger landed on Callao, Peru. A post office called Callao has been in operation since 1859.

The Johnson Morrow House was listed on the National Register of Historic Places in 1994.

Geography

Demographics

2010 census
As of the census of 2010, there were 292 people, 112 households, and 81 families living in the city. The racial makeup of the city was 96.2% White, 1.0% African American, 0.3% Native American, and 2.4% from two or more races. Hispanic or Latino of any race were 1.4% of the population.

There were 112 households, of which 32.1% had children under the age of 18 living with them, 46.4% were married couples living together, 11.6% had a female householder with no husband present, 14.3% had a male householder with no wife present, and 27.7% were non-families. 23.2% of all households were made up of individuals, and 5.4% had someone living alone who was 65 years of age or older. The average household size was 2.61 and the average family size was 2.96.

The median age in the city was 39.8 years. 26.7% of residents were under the age of 18; 7.5% were between the ages of 18 and 24; 20.9% were from 25 to 44; 33.2% were from 45 to 64; and 11.6% were 65 years of age or older. The gender makeup of the city was 50.3% male and 49.7% female.

2000 census
As of the census of 2000, there were 291 people, 117 households, and 78 families living in the city. The population density was 580.0 people per square mile (224.7/km2). There were 152 housing units at an average density of 303.0/sq mi (117.4/km2). The racial makeup of the city was 99.31% White, 0.34% Native American, and 0.34% from two or more races.

There were 117 households, out of which 24.8% had children under the age of 18 living with them, 55.6% were married couples living together, 7.7% had a female householder with no husband present, and 32.5% were non-families. 24.8% of all households were made up of individuals, and 12.8% had someone living alone who was 65 years of age or older. The average household size was 2.49 and the average family size was 2.95.

In the city the population was spread out, with 23.7% under the age of 18, 8.9% from 18 to 24, 24.7% from 25 to 44, 23.4% from 45 to 64, and 19.2% who were 65 years of age or older. The median age was 40 years. For every 100 females there were 99.3 males. For every 100 females age 18 and over, there were 88.1 males.

The median income for a household in the city was $24,659, and the median income for a family was $32,813. Males had a median income of $22,500 versus $15,125 for females. The per capita income for the city was $12,573. About 18.7% of families and 26.1% of the population were below the poverty line, including 65.3% of those under the age of eighteen and 9.6% of those 65 or over.

References

External links
 Historic maps of Callao in the Sanborn Maps of Missouri Collection  at the University of Missouri

Cities in Missouri
Cities in Macon County, Missouri

ca:Callao
es:Callao
kk:Колао